4x4x4 may refer to:

 Rubik's Revenge
 4WS